Leon le Roux (born 27 December 1991) is a South African cricketer. He played in one Twenty20 match for Boland in 2013.

See also
 List of Boland representative cricketers

References

External links
 

1991 births
Living people
South African cricketers
Boland cricketers
Place of birth missing (living people)